Aklanski Ostrog (Russian : Акланский острог) or Penzhinskoye zimovye (Пенжинское зимовье; "wintering place Penzhina") was a fortified city in Russia between 1679 and 1804 on the river Oklan (then Chajachla or Aklan), into which the Penzhina flows. The city, established by Vladimir Atlasov as a stronghold for the Koryaks forcing jasak to pay, was not much more than a fortified place, having the status of oejezdstad. The place was also hated by the Koryaks (the place burned down several times) and the Yukaghirs (which besieged the place once). The nearest place was the Ostrog Anadyrsk, on the middle reaches of the Anadyr.

Around 1680 there was a log cabin with two shelters, one for the Cossacks and Koryak prisoners, who Amanat were held to Koryaks to force the jasak to be invoked. Beside the house was a shed for the storage of sable skins.

History 
In 1705, the Ostrog was besieged by Koryaks but again dismayed because in 1706 help arrived from Yakutsk. In 1714 it was again besieged by the Ostrog Yukaghirs and Koryaks, but again not taken, because in 1716 help arrived from Yakutsk. In 1743, a new square Ostrog built with a length of 15 sazjen (32 meters) on each side and a height of 2 sazjen (4.3 meters). In the Ostrog risen one hijack a home for the military commander, barracks, a storehouse for the jasak and 2 barns.

From 26 November 1745 to March 1746, was again besieged by the Ostrog Koryaks, which however itself withdrew. After another attack were not enough men to defend the fort and pulled the other occupation to Anadyrsk, which killed some way. There came a great uprising among Koryaks which many Cossacks were slain and their fortresses were laid in ashes. In 1748, the Ostrog of Aklansk burned by Koryaks and weapons were present included, although these Cossacks had hidden in the ground. In 1751, 407 men presenting army from Anadyrsk sent to the uprising Koryaks precipitate, leaving hundreds dead. After a number of wars gave Koryaks finally surrendered in 1757 after about half of their people were slain.

In 1785, an attempt was made by the Russians to Aklansk to rebuild on the Penzhina River but Koryaks were heavily against a new presence of Russians in the middle of their territory and attacked the group of Cossacks that was sent to a good place to determine, in which a number of the Cossacks was slain. A year later Aklansk still rebuilt to Aklan and a number of administrative functions housed here from Tigil, where previously they were temporarily housed since 1782.

In 1804, however, the Kamchatka Oblast was established, the administrative functions were centered in Nizhnekamchatsk, Izhiginsk and Aklansk, at the edge of the new oblast layers were thereby abandoned and destroyed.

References 
 

History of the Kamchatka Peninsula